Vladimir Pronin (Russian: Владимир Пронин; born 27 May 1969 in Moscow) is a retired Russian track and field athlete who specialised in the 3000 metres steeplechase. He represented his country two Olympic Games, in 1996 and 2000, as well as three consecutive World Championships starting in 1993.

His personal best in the event is 8:16.59 set in Gothenburg in 1995.

Competition record

References

1969 births
Living people
Athletes from Moscow
Russian male steeplechase runners
Olympic male steeplechase runners
Olympic athletes of Russia
Athletes (track and field) at the 1996 Summer Olympics
Athletes (track and field) at the 2000 Summer Olympics
Universiade medalists in athletics (track and field)
Universiade silver medalists for Russia
Competitors at the 1994 Goodwill Games
World Athletics Championships athletes for Russia
Russian Athletics Championships winners